Temenia (Greek: Τεμένια) is a community and a small village in Chania regional unit on the island of Crete, Greece. It is part of the municipal unit of East Selino (Anatoliko Selino). The community consists of the following villages (population in 2011):
Temenia, pop. 49
Pappadiana, pop. 3
Stratoi, pop. 15

Near Temenia is located the ancient city of Yrtakina. In Temenia also there is a spring-spa. Because of the healthy water, there is a small hotel and a refreshments factory in Temenia.

References

Populated places in Chania (regional unit)